The Roanoke Park Historic District a national historic district located at Raleigh, North Carolina.  It is one of the city's historic Five Points neighborhoods and encompasses 446 contributing buildings and 1 contributing site. It is situated southeast of the Five Points intersection of Glenwood Avenue and Fairview and Whitaker Mill Roads. Roanoke Park is composed of six separate plats, filed from 1913 to 1926, and is roughly shaped like a diamond.

Architecturally, houses with American Craftsman detailing, such as bungalows and American Foursquares, constitute the majority of the neighborhood. However, some of the oldest houses in Five Points are located in Roanoke Park, and these homes employ more vernacular styles, including Greek Revival, side-gabled Triple-A cottages, and narrow shotgun houses, particularly along Sunrise Avenue.

Developers created the neighborhood's namesake Roanoke Park subdivision in 1922. Its promoters appealed to white first-time homebuyers and boasted about the suburb's location next to Hayes Barton, an upper-class neighborhood also in Five Points. This section of the neighborhood centers on a park and includes the largest period revival houses.

Roanoke Park was listed on the National Register of Historic Places in 2003 as a Historic District.

See also
 Five Points Historic Neighborhoods (Raleigh, North Carolina)
 List of Registered Historic Places in North Carolina

References

External links 
 National Register Historic Districts in Raleigh, North Carolina, RHDC
 Roanoke Park Historic District, RHDC
 Five Points Neighborhoods, RHDC

Historic districts on the National Register of Historic Places in North Carolina
Greek Revival houses in North Carolina
National Register of Historic Places in Raleigh, North Carolina
Neighborhoods in Raleigh, North Carolina